Macé is a commune in the Orne department in north-western France.

Population

See also
Communes of the Orne department

References

External links

  Localisation de Macé sur une carte de France et communes limitrophes

Communes of Orne